Pompton Plains is a census-designated place (CDP) and unincorporated community constituting the majority of Pequannock Township, Morris County, in the U.S. state of New Jersey. As of the 2020 United States census, the CDP’s population was 11,144. The community was first listed as a CDP in advance of the 2020 census.

Geography
Pompton Plains is situated in the valley of the Pompton River, which forms the eastern border of the community, the township, and Morris County. Across the river to the east is Wayne in Passaic County, and across the river to the northeast is the borough of Pompton Lakes. Neighboring communities in Morris County are Riverdale to the north, Kinnelon to the west, Lincoln Park to the southwest, and the remainder of Pequannock Township to the south.

New Jersey Route 23 runs through the east side of the community, leading northwest  to Franklin and south  to Interstate 80 in Wayne. Interstate 287 passes through the northwest part of Pompton Plains, with the closest access from Exit 52 (Route 23) in Riverdale.

Notable people

People who were born in, residents of, or otherwise closely associated with Pompton Plains include:
 Jason Biggs (born 1978), actor who has appeared in the American Pie films
 Michael T. Cahill, Dean of Brooklyn Law School
 Peter Cameron (born 1959), novelist and short-story writer.
 Davana Medina (born 1974), figure competitor
 Susan Misner (born 1971), actress who has appeared on films and television, including roles in One Life to Live, The Bronx Is Burning, Rescue Me and Chicago
 French Montana (born 1984), rapper
 Criss Oliva (1963–1993), musician who was the lead guitarist and co-founder of Savatage
 Pete Yorn (born 1974), singer-songwriter and musician

References 

Census-designated places in Morris County, New Jersey
Census-designated places in New Jersey
Pequannock Township, New Jersey